Arkady Vasilyevich Malov (Chuvash and ; 28 April 1928 in Bolshiye Toktashi village, Alikovsky District, Chuvash Republic – 25 April 1995 in Cheboksary) was a Chuvash poet and translator.

Biography 
Arkady Malov was born on 28 April 1928 in Bolshiye Toktashi village, Alikovsky District of the Chuvashia.

Arkady Malov studied in Hodar middle school in the Shumerlinsky District, and in pedagogic department of the Chuvash State University.

Malov worked as an editor of Chuvash State book publishing house, as secretary of Chuvash magazine «Ялав» (Flag), and as chief-editor of the Chuvash literature magazine «Тӑван Атӑл» (Native Atal).

Poet died on 25 April 1995 in Cheboksary.

Creative life

Well-known works

Translation 
 S. Antonov, «Юманай такмакӗсем» (Yumany short songs);
 S. Shlyakhoo, «Ваня юлташ»; (Vanya-friend)
 M. Sholohov, «Лӑпкӑ Тан (Дон)» (Quiet Don);
 I. Kazakevich, «Кӑвак тетрадь» (Blue notebook).
 L. Tolstoy, «Вӑрҫӑпа лӑпкӑлӑх» (War and peace).

External links 
 Малов А.В.

Chuvash-language poets
Chuvash writers
1995 deaths
1928 births
People from Alikovsky District
20th-century poets